Abena is an Indian (Gujarati) surname; the Gujarati અબેના (Abēnā) possibly came from the Arabic name أبين (Abyan). As a given name, it is a girl's name of Ghanaian origin and means born on Tuesday. Day names are a cultural practice of the Akan people of Ghana.  Although some might believe it is mostly practised by Ashanti people, it is actually practised by all Akan (i.e. all the various Akan subgroups) people who follow traditional customs. People born on particular days are supposed to exhibit the characteristics or attributes and philosophy, associated with the days. Abena has the appellation Kosia or Nimo, meaning friendliness. Thus, females named Abena are supposed to be friendly.

Origin and meaning of Abena 
In the Akan culture, day names are known to be derived from deities. Abena is originated from Koyabenada and from the Lord of Life’s Land deity of the day Tuesday. Females born on Tuesday tend to be nurturing and achieve a balance between strength and compassion.

Female variants of Abena 
Day names in Ghana have varying spellings, because of the various Akan subgroups. Each Akan subgroup has a similar or different spelling for the day name to other Akan subgroups. The spelling Abena is used by the Akuapem, Ashanti and Fante subgroups.

Male version of Abena 
In the Akan culture and other local cultures in Ghana, day names come in pairs for males and females. The variant of the name used for a male child born on Tuesday Kwabena.

Notable people with surname Abena
Martin Abena (born 1986), Cameroonian footballer
Myenty Abena (born 1994), Surinamese footballer
Ninon Abena (born 1994), Cameroonian footballer
Richard Abena (born 1960), Cameroonian footballer

Notable people with given name
Abena Amoah, Ghanaian banker and financial advisor
Abena Appiah (born 1993), Ghanaian-American singer, model, and beauty queen
Abena Osei Asare (born 1979), Ghanaian politician
Abena Brigidi, Ghanaian investment analyst author and speaker
Abena Joan Brown (1928–2015), American businesswoman, theatre producer and arts patron
Abena Busia (born 1953), Ghanaian writer and poet
Abena Dugan, Ghanaian youth and gender advocate
Abena Malika, Canadian actress, singer and DJ
Abena Durowaa Mensah (born 1977), Ghanaian politician
Abena Oduro (born 1959), Ghanaian economist
Abena Oppong-Asare (born 1983), British Labour Party politician
Abena Osei-Poku (born 1971), Ghanaian corporate executive
Abena Rockstar, Ghanaian rapper and songwriter
Abena Takyiwa (born 1958), Ghanaian politician

References 

Feminine given names
African feminine given names